Erik Nicklas Lidström (born 28 April 1970) is a Swedish former professional ice hockey defenceman and current vice president of hockey operations for the Detroit Red Wings. He played 20 seasons in the National Hockey League (NHL) for the Detroit Red Wings from 1991 to 2012, which he captained for the final six seasons of his career. He is widely regarded as one of the greatest defencemen in NHL history and nicknamed "The Perfect Human."

Over his 20 NHL seasons, Lidström won four Stanley Cup championships, seven James Norris Memorial Trophies (awarded to the NHL's top defenceman), one Conn Smythe Trophy as the playoff most valuable player, and was voted into 12 NHL All-Star Games. The Red Wings never missed the playoffs during his career, the longest in league history for a player never missing the playoffs. Lidström was the first European-born-and-trained captain of a Stanley Cup-winning team, as well as the first European player named playoff MVP. Lidström is also the all-time leader in games played with a single NHL team by a European-born player. Lidström was inducted into the Hockey Hall of Fame on 9 November 2015. In 2017, Lidström was named one of the "100 Greatest NHL Players" in history.

Playing career 
Widely considered one of the greatest defencemen of all time, Lidström was awarded the Norris Trophy seven times, a feat matched by only two other players: Doug Harvey and by Bobby Orr (who won the trophy eight times). Lidström was nominated for the award a total of 12 times in his last 14 seasons in the NHL, the first three times finishing as the runner-up, and won it in seven of his last ten (2004–05 had no winner due to the NHL lockout). In his final 16 seasons (beginning in 1995–96), he finished no lower than sixth place in Norris Trophy voting.

Lidström played his entire 20-year NHL career with the Detroit Red Wings, finishing his career with the second-most Stanley Cup playoff games played in NHL history, with 263 appearances (Chris Chelios ranks first with 266). He was a member of four Stanley Cup-winning teams, in 1996–97, 1997–98, 2001–02 and 2007–08. Save for the cancelled 2004–05 season lockout year, Lidström played in the playoffs for an NHL record 20 consecutive seasons (an honour he shares with Larry Robinson).

Known for his durability, Lidström consistently ranked amongst the top in the NHL in ice time per game. He averaged 28:07 minutes in the 2005–06 season, a career-high. He won three consecutive Norris Trophies from 2001 to 2003 to become the first defenceman since Bobby Orr to win three straight. In the 2003–04 season, he played in the 1,000th game of his career, having missed only 17 games in 12-and-a-half seasons (1994–95 was shortened to 48 games instead of the usual 82 by a labour dispute).

In the 2002 Stanley Cup playoffs, Lidström was named the winner of the Conn Smythe Trophy as most valuable player during the playoffs, becoming the first European to ever be awarded the trophy.

Early career 
Lidström began his career in Avesta, Sweden, playing with Skogsbo SK, before moving on to play with VIK Västerås HK of the Swedish Elitserien. In three seasons with the team, he played in 103 games, scoring 12 goals and 30 assists. Drafted by the Detroit Red Wings 53rd overall in the 1989 NHL Entry Draft, Lidström joined the team in the 1991–92 season, though he returned to play for Västerås IK for a brief period during the 1994–95 NHL lockout. Lidström scored 60 points in his rookie season, finishing second to Pavel Bure in voting for that year's Calder Trophy. He was selected to the 1992 NHL All-Rookie Team, along with fellow Red Wings defenceman Vladimir Konstantinov.

NHL career (1991–2012)

Post-lockout career 
Lidström was set to make $10 million during the 2005–06 season. However, due to the new terms of the NHL Collective Bargaining Agreement that was implemented during the 2004–05 season, salaries on pre-existing contracts were reduced by 24%, which lowered his compensation to $7.6 million. That season, he posted a career-high 64 assists and 16 goals to for 80 points.

On 30 June 2006, it was announced that Lidström had signed a two-year, $15.2 million contract extension with the Red Wings. Instead of seeking more money elsewhere, Lidström decided to remain with Detroit for the same annual salary as he earned during the 2005–06 season.

Lidström was an alternate captain of the Red Wings since the 1997–98 season, but was awarded the captaincy after the 2006 retirement of long-time Red Wings captain Steve Yzerman. It was an honour made more special by the fact that he became the first European captain in franchise history. In his first year of captaincy, Lidström led the Red Wings to the Western Conference Finals, but lost to eventual Stanley Cup champions, the Anaheim Ducks. In the off-season, Lidström joined an elite group by capturing the Norris Trophy as the NHL's outstanding defenceman for the fifth time. Lidström became the fourth defenceman in NHL history with as many as five Norris Trophy wins, joining Hockey Hall of Famers Bobby Orr (eight), Doug Harvey (seven) and Ray Bourque (five).

Near the beginning of the 2007–08 season, in an 8 October win against the Edmonton Oilers, Lidström registered two assists to surpass Peter Forsberg as the second-highest scoring Swedish-born NHL player of all-time. Accordingly, he trails only Mats Sundin (as of the end of the 2011–12 season, Lidström has 1,142 points to Sundin's 1,349). Later in the season, on 26 December, Lidström signed a contract extension through the 2009–10 season. Several months later, on 3 April 2008, he assisted on a goal by Johan Franzén to tie Luc Robitaille at 42nd in the all-time NHL assists, with 726.

Entering the playoffs as Presidents' Trophy winners for the highest team point total during the regular season, the Red Wings met the Pittsburgh Penguins in the 2008 Stanley Cup Finals. Despite a Game 5, triple-overtime victory by the Penguins to stave off elimination, Lidström and the Red Wings defeated Pittsburgh in Game 6 to capture the Stanley Cup. In doing so, Lidström became the first European-born-and-trained captain to win the Stanley Cup. In 1934, Charlie Gardiner, a goaltender born in Scotland, had captained the Chicago Black Hawks to win the Stanley Cup and in 1938, Johnny Gottselig, a left-winger born in Russia, also captained Chicago to a championship, but both players were trained in Canada.

Just over one week after winning his fourth Stanley Cup in 11 seasons, on 12 June, Lidström won the Norris Trophy for the third-straight season and the sixth time in seven seasons.

As the Red Wings opened the 2008–09 pre-season against the Montreal Canadiens, Lidström suffered a broken nose as a shot from Canadiens forward Chris Higgins ricocheted and hit him in the face. From then on, he began wearing a visor. He returned in time for the regular season and was selected to the 2009 NHL All-Star Game in Montreal. However, in the midst of dealing with tendinitis that had been bothering him all season, Lidström chose to sit out All-Star weekend, along with teammate Pavel Datsyuk. Consequently, Lidström and Datsyuk were both suspended one game by the NHL due to League policy for missing the All-Star Game without significant injury.

The Red Wings opened the 2009–10 season in Stockholm, Sweden. During the team's trip in Sweden, Lidström was honored by his home county, Dalarna, as an Ambassador of Honor. On 15 October 2009, in a game against the Los Angeles Kings, Lidström became the first European-born defenceman to reach 1,000 points after recording two assists in the game. He is the fourth player to score 1,000 points as a Red Wing (after Gordie Howe, Alex Delvecchio and Steve Yzerman), and the eighth defenceman to do so in the history of the NHL. On 5 March 2010, Lidström earned his 800th career assist. Also during the 2009–10 season, Lidström played in his 1,395th game (finishing the season with 1,412), setting an all-time record for NHL games played by a player born in Europe; earlier in the season, Lidström had passed Teppo Numminen for games played by a player trained in Europe. Lidström is also second all-time in games played in a Red Wing uniform, behind only Howe.

On 23 April 2010, Lidström played in his 237th career playoff game, moving past Mark Messier into sole possession of third place on the NHL's all-time list (Chris Chelios, 266; Patrick Roy, 247). In the same game, he had an assist to tie Al MacInnis (121) for the third-most assists in the post-season by a defenceman (Ray Bourque 139; Paul Coffey 137).

On 27 April 2010, a day before his 40th birthday, Lidström had three points in a Game 7 win over the Phoenix Coyotes in the first round of the 2010 playoffs, pushing his active playoff points lead to 171 points, and tying him for 17th on the all-time playoff points list with fellow countryman Peter Forsberg.

As of the end of the 2009–10 season, Lidström has missed only 28 of a possible 1,440 regular-season team games (one due to suspension).

After contemplating retirement, Lidström agreed on a one-year contract with the Red Wings on 1 June 2010; the contract paid him slightly over $6 million.

On 15 December 2010, Lidström recorded his first career hat-trick, at 40 years of age, against the St. Louis Blues, sealing a 5–2 Detroit victory. After the game, he was asked how it feels to score his first hat-trick, responding, "It feels great, I've never in my life been able to notch three goals in a game." The hat-trick made him the oldest player in NHL history to record his first hat-trick (previously held by Scott Mellanby at 36 years of age), and the oldest defenceman in NHL history to record a hat-trick (previously held by Mathieu Schneider at 37 years of age).

On 18 January 2011, Lidström was named a team captain in the 2011 NHL All-Star Game in Raleigh, North Carolina. His team won by a final score of 11–10 over Team Staal, captained by Eric Staal of the Carolina Hurricanes. Lidström finished +7 with one assist.

On 20 June 2011, after briefly contemplating retirement yet again, Lidström signed a one-year contract worth $6.2 million with Detroit, the same amount he had been paid the previous season. On 23 June 2011, he won his seventh Norris Trophy even though his plus/minus rating for the year was −2, tying with Doug Harvey and remaining one behind Bobby Orr for most Norris Trophies.  This was only the third time in history that a player with a negative plus/minus rating won the Norris Trophy.

On 22 October 2011, in a game against the Washington Capitals, Lidström became the 14th player in the history of the NHL to play 1,500 games. He is the first player not being born in North America, and therefore the first Swedish and European player, as well as the first player to accomplish this in his 20th NHL season. Lidström played in his 1,550th game on 12 February 2012, against the Philadelphia Flyers, surpassing Alex Delvecchio's previous Red Wing record of 1,549 games. This also makes him the NHL player who has played the most games while always playing for the same NHL team (Gordie Howe played more games, 1,687, with the Red Wings, but also played for the Hartford Whalers for one season). In this regard, Lidström joins former Red Wings Alex Delvecchio and Steve Yzerman as the only three players with over 1,500 games having played exclusively for just one team throughout their careers.

Retirement 

On 31 May 2012, Lidström announced his retirement from the NHL via a press conference with Red Wings Owner Mike Ilitch and General Manager Ken Holland present. The night before, he told the Swedish tabloid Expressen, "I came to the decision last week and I informed our general manager, Ken Holland." Discussing Lidström's retirement, former teammate Steve Yzerman described Lidström as "one of the all-time best defencemen to ever play." Former teammate and fellow Norris Trophy winning defenseman Paul Coffey said, "He was an incredible player" while Chris Chelios said, "There's been guys who are great players, but no one's better than Nick. As good? Yes. But this is as big as it gets. He's one of the best athletes ever and...if you're going to talk about someone who's perfect, Nick's pretty darn close to being perfect." Washington Capitals defenceman John Carlson described Lidström as "one of the game's all-time greats on and off the ice." Ken Holland stated his belief that Lidström was "the most valuable player of his era."

The following weekend, on 3 June 2012, Lidström and his wife took out a full-page ad giving thanks to the city of Detroit for making his family feel at home for the past 21 years. On 8 July 2012, Lidström was named a scout for the Red Wings.

On 28 February 2014, Lidström was inducted into the Michigan Sports Hall of Fame.

During the 2013–14 season, Lidström had his number 5 jersey retired by the Red Wings. Initially, ceremonies were planned for the previous season, on 5 February 2013 — however, the lockout had made it hard to determine when Lidström would be able to attend the ceremony. The Red Wings officially retired his number on 6 March 2014, in a pre-game ceremony at Joe Louis Arena.

International play 

Representing Sweden, Lidström won the World Championship in 1991. At the 2006 Winter Olympics, Lidström was a major factor in Sweden's win over Finland in the finals, scoring the gold medal-clinching goal, thus earning him a spot on the Olympic All-Star team. He also became the 17th member of the Triple Gold Club. The Hockey News selected Lidström as the "Best European-trained player ever in the NHL." The Sporting News and Sports Illustrated selected Lidström as the "NHL Player of the Decade."

Prior to his NHL career, Lidström competed in one European Junior Championships in 1988, one World Junior Championship in 1990 and one Canada Cup in 1991 for Sweden.

Prior to his rookie season with the Red Wings, he earned his first gold medal with Sweden at the 1991 World Championships. Three years later, he competed in the 1994 World Championships in Italy and won a bronze medal. Two years later, he participated in the inaugural 1996 World Cup of Hockey (successor of the Canada Cup) and contributed three points in four games.  He made his Olympic debut with Sweden at the 1998 Winter Olympics in Nagano, Japan.

Four years later was his next international appearance, playing in his second Olympics at the 2002 Winter Olympics in Salt Lake City, where Sweden was upset by Belarus in the quarter-final after being heavy favourites in the round-robin.  Lidström made his third World Championships appearance in 2004, but only appeared in two games. That summer, he also competed in the 2004 World Cup of Hockey, where he scored one goal.

In the 2006 Winter Olympics in Turin, Italy, Lidström helped Sweden avenge their quarter-final upset to Belarus in Salt Lake City, scoring the game winning goal in the gold medal game against Finland. In doing so, Lidström became a member of the Triple Gold Club, adding an Olympic gold medal to go with his previous Stanley Cups with Detroit and his World Championship gold medal in 1991.  Lidström was also selected to the 2010 Olympic All-Star team.

Lidström also played for Sweden in the 2010 Winter Olympics in Vancouver, serving as team captain in what would be his final Olympic appearance. Lidström announced his retirement from Olympic competition following Sweden's loss to Slovakia.

Personal life 
Lidström is married to Annika, with whom he has four children. All four sons play high-level hockey: Kevin (born 1994), is currently a defenceman for Swedish Division 1 team SK Lejon; Adam (born 1996) also plays in Division 1 with Enköpings SK; Samuel (born in 2000) plays on J20 SuperElit team VIK Västerås HK; and Lucas (born in 2003) also plays for VIK Västerås HK on its U16 team.

Lidström was featured on an episode of NHL 36.

In October 2019, Lidström released his authorized biography in North America titled Nicklas Lidstrom: The Pursuit of Perfection.

Career statistics

Regular season and playoffs

International

Awards 
 World Championship gold medal winner (Sweden, 1991).
 NHL All-Rookie Team (1992).
 4x Stanley Cup winner (1997, 1998, 2002, and 2008).
 12x NHL All-Star Game (1996, 1998, 1999, 2000, 2001, 2002, 2003, 2004, 2007, 2008, 2009*, 2011).
 10x NHL first All-Star team member (1998, 1999, 2000, 2001, 2002, 2003, 2006, 2007, 2008, 2011).
 2x NHL Second All-Star Team member (2009, 2010).
 7x Norris Trophy winner (2001, 2002, 2003, 2006, 2007, 2008, 2011).
 Conn Smythe Trophy winner (2002).
 Olympic gold medal winner (Sweden, 2006)
 Olympic All-Star team (2006).
 Member of the Triple Gold Club.
 2x Viking Award winner (2000 and 2006).
 Inducted into the Michigan Sports Hall of Fame – 2014
 Detroit Red Wings #5 retired on 6 March 2014
 Inducted into the IIHF Hall of Fame – 2014
 Inducted into the Hockey Hall of Fame – 2015
 Introduced into the IIHF All-Time Sweden Team - 2020
*did not attend

Records 
All records are as of the end of the  regular season unless otherwise noted.

NHL 
 First European-born and trained Norris Trophy winner (2000–01).
 First European-born and trained Conn Smythe Trophy winner (2001–02).
 Fourth defenceman (and first European-born and trained defenceman) in NHL to win James Norris Memorial Trophy three years running (2001–2003, 2006–2008), and third seven-time Norris Trophy winner.
 First European-born and trained captain of a Stanley Cup-winning team (2008).
 First European-born and trained defenceman to reach 1,000 points.
 Most regular-season games played by a player born in Europe, any position (1,564).
 Most regular-season games played by a player in a career spent with only one team (1,564).
 Most regular-season wins played in (900).
 Most postseason games played with single franchise, career (263)
 Most postseason assists by defenceman with single franchise, career (129)
 Most postseason points by defenceman with single franchise, career (183)
 Highest postseason plus/minus, career (+61)
 Most postseason power-play goals by defenceman, career (30)
 Most postseason shots on goal with single franchise, career (656)
 Oldest player to record his first hat-trick (40 years, 210 days)
 Oldest defenceman to record a hat-trick (40 years, 210 days)
 Oldest Norris Trophy winner (41 years, 57 days) (2010–2011)
 Oldest defenceman to score in a Game 7 (39 years, 364 days)

Detroit Red Wings 
 Points by a defenceman, season (2005–06, 80).
 Assists by a defenceman, season (2005–06, 64).
 Postseason goals by a defenceman, career (54).
 Post-season power-play goals, career (30).
 Power play goals by a defenceman, career (132).
 Postseason points by a defenceman, career (183).
 Postseason assists, career (129).
 Postseason games played, career (263).
 Games played by a defenceman, career (1,564).
 Goals, assists, and points by a defenceman, career (264, 878, and 1142).
 Goals in a single postseason by a defenceman (1998, 6).
 Best postseason plus/minus, career (+61).
 Best regular season plus/minus, career (+450).

See also 
 List of NHL players with 1,000 points
 List of NHL players with 1,000 games played
 List of Detroit Red Wings award winners
 List of Detroit Red Wings draft picks
 List of Detroit Red Wings records

References

External links 

1970 births
Living people
Conn Smythe Trophy winners
Detroit Red Wings captains
Detroit Red Wings draft picks
Detroit Red Wings players
Detroit Red Wings scouts
Hockey Hall of Fame inductees
Ice hockey players at the 1998 Winter Olympics
Ice hockey players at the 2002 Winter Olympics
Ice hockey players at the 2006 Winter Olympics
Ice hockey players at the 2010 Winter Olympics
IIHF Hall of Fame inductees
James Norris Memorial Trophy winners
Medalists at the 2006 Winter Olympics
National Hockey League All-Stars
National Hockey League players with retired numbers
Olympic gold medalists for Sweden
Olympic ice hockey players of Sweden
Olympic medalists in ice hockey
Sportspeople from Västerås
Stanley Cup champions
Swedish expatriate ice hockey players in the United States
Swedish ice hockey defencemen
Triple Gold Club
VIK Västerås HK players